This was the second edition of the event.

Jan Vacek chose not to defend the title.

Ota Fukárek won in the final 6–3, 6–3 against Cristiano Caratti.

Seeds

Draw

Finals

Top half

Bottom half

References
 Draws on ITF Site

2001 Singles